James John Bickford (November 2, 1912October 3, 1989) was an American bobsledder who competed from the late 1930s to the mid-1950s. Competing in four Winter Olympics, he won a bronze medal in the four-man event at St. Moritz in 1948.

Bickford also carried the United States flag during the opening ceremonies of the 1952 and 1956 Winter Olympics.

At the FIBT World Championships, he won three medals with one silver (Four-man: 1949) and two bronzes (Two-man: 1954, Four-man: 1937).

References
1936 bobsleigh four-man results
Bobsleigh four-man Olympic medalists for 1924, 1932-56, and since 1964
Bobsleigh two-man world championship medalists since 1931
Bobsleigh four-man world championship medalists since 1930
DatabaseOlympics.com profile
List of American flag bearers during the Winter Olympic opening ceremonies.

1912 births
1989 deaths
American male bobsledders
Bobsledders at the 1936 Winter Olympics
Bobsledders at the 1948 Winter Olympics
Bobsledders at the 1952 Winter Olympics
Bobsledders at the 1956 Winter Olympics
Medalists at the 1948 Winter Olympics
Olympic bronze medalists for the United States in bobsleigh